Robin Andrew Evelyn Coningham, FSA, FRAS (born 2 December 1965) is a British archaeologist and academic, specialising in South Asian archaeology and archaeological ethics. He has been Professor of Early Medieval Archaeology  since 2005 and UNESCO Chair in Archaeological Ethics and Practice in Cultural Heritage since 2014 at the University of Durham. From 1994 to 2005, he taught at the University of Bradford, rising to become Professor of South Asian Archaeology and Head of the Department of Archaeological Sciences.

Academic career
Coningham led the excavation of the Maya Devi Temple in Lumbini, Nepal; an ancient Buddhist temple situated at the site traditionally considered the birthplace of Buddha.

In 1994, Coningham was elected a Fellow of the Royal Asiatic Society (FRAS). On 4 February 2016, he was elected a Fellow of the Society of Antiquaries of London (FSA).

Selected works

References

1965 births
Living people
British archaeologists
20th-century archaeologists
21st-century archaeologists
Academics of the University of Bradford
Academics of Durham University
Archaeologists of South Asia
Fellows of the Society of Antiquaries of London
Fellows of the Royal Asiatic Society